David Darmon (born 11 March 1974) is a retired French football midfielder.

References

1974 births
Living people
French footballers
FC Sète 34 players
Nîmes Olympique players
ASOA Valence players
FC Gueugnon players
Racing de Ferrol footballers
CD Leganés players
Elche CF players
AS Béziers Hérault (football) players
Association football midfielders
Ligue 2 players
French expatriate footballers
Expatriate footballers in Spain
French expatriate sportspeople in Spain